Anne Elizabeth "Annie" Darwin (2 March 1841 – 23 April 1851) was the second child and eldest daughter of Charles and Emma Darwin.

Life
In 1849, Anne caught scarlet fever along with her two sisters, and her health thereafter declined; some authorities believe that she suffered from tuberculosis. In vain pursuit of help from James Manby Gully's hydrotherapy, Charles Darwin took his daughter to the Worcestershire spa town, Great Malvern. She died in Montreal House on the Worcester Road, aged ten, and was buried in the Great Malvern Priory churchyard.

Annie's death was a terrible blow for her parents. Charles wrote in a personal memoir "We have lost the joy of the household, and the solace of our old age.... Oh that she could now know how deeply, how tenderly we do still & and shall ever love her dear joyous face."

Darwin scholar E. Janet Browne writes:

The loss of Charles Darwin's beloved daughter was softened only by the addition of Horace Darwin, who was born only three weeks after Anne's death on 13 May 1851.

Annie's Box
Around 2000, Charles Darwin's great-great-grandson Randal Keynes discovered a box containing keepsakes of Anne collected by Charles and Emma. He wrote a biography of Charles Darwin centred on the relationship between Darwin and his daughter, entitled Annie's Box; the script of the 2009 film Creation is based on the book.

Notes

References
Keynes, Randal (2001). Annie's Box: Charles Darwin, His Daughter, and Human Evolution. Fourth Estate, London. . (Review)
 Darwin's memorial of Anne Elizabeth Darwin at the Darwin Correspondence Project, University of Cambridge
 Original letters about Annie's death at the Darwin Correspondence Project, University of Cambridge
Browne, Janet (1995). Charles Darwin: Voyaging.  New York:  Random House.  . (The characterization of Anne Darwin appears on p. 499.)

1841 births
1851 deaths
19th-century deaths from tuberculosis
Darwin–Wedgwood family
Tuberculosis deaths in England
Deaths from streptococcus infection
People associated with Malvern, Worcestershire
English children

fr:Famille Darwin-Wedgwood#Anne Darwin
Child deaths